Dominika Mrmolja (born 28 April 1994) is a Slovenian handball player for Dunaújvárosi Kohász KA and the Slovenian national team.

She represented Slovenia at the 2021 World Women's Handball Championship in Spain.

References

External links

1994 births
Living people
Slovenian female handball players
People from Postojna